This is a list of cities, towns and villages in the de facto independent Republic of Artsakh.

In Artsakh, a city/town is not defined by the size of its population. The municipalities in Artsakh are divided into 2 categories: urban communities and rural communities. According to the 2015 Artsakh statistics, there were 13 urban communities and 322 rural communities in Artsakh.

A census detailing the population of all urban and rural communities was held in Artsakh in 2005, and a report containing demographic data, including population statistics for Artsakh urban and rural communities as of 2015, was compiled by Hakob Ghahramanyan, and published online by the Artsakh E-Library in 2018.

Artsakh communities controlled by Artsakh 

This is a complete list of urban and rural communities controlled by the Republic of Artsakh since the end of 2020 Nagorno-Karabakh war.

Urban communities

List of urban and rural communities by province

Askeran Province

Kashatagh Province

Martakert Province

Martuni Province

Shahumyan Province

Shushi Province

Artsakh communities controlled by Azerbaijan 

This is a complete list of urban and rural communities formerly in the Republic of Artsakh, controlled by Azerbaijan since the 2020 Nagorno-Karabakh war.

Urban communities

List of urban and rural communities by province

Askeran Province

Hadrut Province

Kashatagh Province

Martakert Province

Martuni Province

Shahumyan Province

Shushi Province

Shahumyan district and Getashen subdistrict 

The following list details towns in the Soviet Shahumyan district and Getashen subdistrict that are controlled by Azerbaijan since the First Nagorno-Karabakh war and Operation Ring. Armenians constituted 73.2% of the population of the Shahumyan district in 1979, and the majority of the villages within the Shahumyan district and the Getashen subdistrict had an Armenian majority prior to the First Nagorno-Karabakh war and Operation Ring, with exception for some Azerbaijani-majority villages (as well as some smaller localities), which are mentioned as such in the following list. The Shahumyan district and Getashen subdistrict are claimed by the Republic of Artsakh as part of the Shahumyan Province.

Approximately 17,000 Armenians living in the Shahumyan and Getashen districts were deported out of the region in 1991 during Operation Ring.

Shahumyan district

Getashen subdistrict

See also 
 List of cities and towns in Armenia

References 

Nagorno-Karabakh
Nagorno-Karabakh
Nagorno-Karabakh